Faruk Çakır (born 8 February 1995) is a Turkish professional footballer who plays as a goalkeeper for Bayrampaşaspor in the Turkish TFF Third League.

Professional career
Faruk is a youth academy product of İstanbul Başakşehir F.K., and signed his first professional contract with them in 2013. He made his first senior appearance for Başakşehir in a 4-0 Turkish Cup win over Tepecik Belediyespor on 1 February 2016. Faruk made his professional debut for Başakşehir in a 2-2 Turkish Cup tie with Fenerbahçe on 26 April 2017. He left the club by mutual termination on 8 August 2019.

References

External links
 
 
 
 IBFK Profile

1995 births
Living people
People from Eyüp
Turkish footballers
İstanbul Başakşehir F.K. players
Süper Lig players
Association football goalkeepers
Footballers from Istanbul